This is a list of the National Register of Historic Places listings in Kennebec County, Maine.

This is intended to be a complete list of the properties and districts on the National Register of Historic Places in Kennebec County, Maine, United States. Latitude and longitude coordinates are provided for many National Register properties and districts; these locations may be seen together in a map.

There are 137 properties and districts listed on the National Register in the county, including 7 National Historic Landmarks.  Three sites were once listed on the register but have since been removed.

Current listings

|}

Former listings

|}

See also

 List of National Historic Landmarks in Maine
 National Register of Historic Places listings in Maine

References

Kennebec